C. Velayudham is an Indian politician. He was elected to the Tamil Nadu legislative assembly from Padmanabhapuram constituency in 1996 election. He was the first Bharatiya Janata Party candidate ever elected to Tamil Nadu assembly.

References

External links 
1996 Tamil Nadu Election Results, Election Commission of India

Tamil Nadu MLAs 1996–2001
Bharatiya Janata Party politicians from Tamil Nadu
Living people
Year of birth missing (living people)